The Yang Family Historical Residence is a former residence in Nanzih District, Kaohsiung, Taiwan.

History
The Yang family originally came from Fujian during the reign of Kangxi Emperor of Qing Dynasty. The house was declared a historical building on 27 August 2002.

Architecture
The design of the house follows southern Fujian housing style with courtyard. It has three independent clusters. There is a lobby with two rooms on each side and two more rooms on the wings at the center of the building. Each outer wing on the left and right sides has five rooms.

Transportation
The house is accessible within walking distance west of Oil Refinery Elementary School Station of Kaohsiung MRT.

See also
 List of tourist attractions in Taiwan

References

1882 establishments in China
Buildings and structures in Kaohsiung
Houses completed in 1882
Houses in Taiwan
Tourist attractions in Kaohsiung